Hakmana is a town in the Matara District, Southern Province of Sri Lanka.

Postal Code Hakmana : 81300

See also
List of towns in Southern Province, Sri Lanka

References

Populated places in Southern Province, Sri Lanka
Populated places in Matara District